Vincent Farrar (25 February 1947 – 13 July 2017) was an English professional rugby league footballer who played in the 1960s, 1970s and 1980s, and coached in the 1980s.

Background
Vince Farrar's birth was registered in Pontefract, West Riding of Yorkshire, England, and he died aged 70 in Pontefract, West Yorkshire, England.

Playing career

International honours
Vince Farrar won a cap for England while at Featherstone Rovers in 1977 against France, and won a cap for Great Britain while at Hull in 1978 against Australia.

County honours
Vince Farrar won caps for Yorkshire while at Featherstone Rovers; during the 1971–72 season as an interchange/substitute against Lancashire and Cumberland, during the 1974–75 season against Cumbria and Other Nationalities, during the 1975–76 season against Lancashire, during the 1976–77 season against Lancashire, and during the 1974–75 season against Cumbria, and Lancashire.

Championship appearances
Vince Farrar was captain in Featherstone Rovers' Championship victory during the 1976–77 season.

Challenge Cup Final appearances
Vince Farrar played right-, i.e. number 10, and scored a try in Featherstone Rovers' 33-14 victory over Bradford Northern in the 1973 Challenge Cup Final during the 1972–73 season at Wembley Stadium, London on Saturday 12 May 1973, in front of a crowd of 72,395, and was an interchange/substitute in Hull FC's 5-10 defeat by Hull Kingston Rovers in the 1980 Challenge Cup Final during the 1979–80 season at Wembley Stadium, London on Saturday 3 May 1980, in front of a crowd of 95,000.

County Cup Final appearances
Vince Farrar played  in Featherstone Rovers' 9-12 defeat by Hull F.C. in the 1969 Yorkshire County Cup Final during the 1969–70 season at Headingley Rugby Stadium, Leeds on Saturday 20 September 1969, played  in the 7-23 defeat by Leeds in the 1970 Yorkshire County Cup Final during the 1970–71 season at Odsal Stadium, Bradford on Saturday 21 November 1970, played right-, i.e. number 10, in the 12-16 defeat by Leeds in the 1976 Yorkshire County Cup Final during the 1976–77 season at Headingley Rugby Stadium, Leeds on Saturday 16 October 1976, and played right- in the 7-17 defeat by Castleford in the 1977 Yorkshire County Cup Final during the 1977–78 season at Headingley Rugby Stadium, Leeds on Saturday 15 October 1977.

BBC2 Floodlit Trophy Final appearances
Vince Farrar played right-, i.e. number 10, in Hull FC's 13-3 victory over Hull Kingston Rovers in the 1979 BBC2 Floodlit Trophy Final during the 1979-80 season at the Boulevard, Hull on Tuesday 18 December 1979.

Club career
Vince Farrar made his début for Featherstone Rovers on Saturday 21 August 1965, in the summer of 1977 he was the subject of a transfer bid from Bradford Northern, in 1977 he was transferred to Hull F.C. for a fee £10,000 (based on increases in average earnings, this would be approximately £90,560 in 2016).

Testimonial match
Vince Farrar's benefit season/testimonial match at Featherstone Rovers took place during the 1975–76 season, including the match against Wakefield Trinity at Post Office Road, Featherstone on Good Friday 16 April 1976.

Honoured at Featherstone Rovers
Farrar is a Featherstone Rovers Hall of Fame inductee.

References

External links
 (archived by web.archive.org) Stats → PastPlayers → F at hullfc.com
 (archived by web.archive.org) Statistics at hullfc.com
Photograph 'Alan Rhodes' Perfect Pass' at rlhp.co.uk
Vince Farrar
Featherstone then and now
Coaching Staff - Robin Sharp
Legendary duo join Featherstone Rovers Hall of Fame
 (archived by web.archive.org) Statistics at nrlstats.com

1947 births
2017 deaths
Cronulla-Sutherland Sharks players
England national rugby league team players
English rugby league coaches
English rugby league players
Featherstone Rovers captains
Featherstone Rovers coaches
Featherstone Rovers players
Great Britain national rugby league team players
Hull F.C. captains
Hull F.C. players
Place of death missing
Rugby league hookers
Rugby league locks
Rugby league players from Pontefract
Rugby league props
Sheffield Eagles (1984) players
Yorkshire rugby league team players